Utetheisa cruentata is a moth of the family Erebidae first described by Arthur Gardiner Butler in 1881. It is found on Mauritius in the Indian Ocean.

The larvae feed on Tournefortia argentea.

References

Butler, A. G. (1881). Illustrations of Typical Specimens of Lepidoptera Heterocera in the Collection of the British Museum. 5:i–xii, 1–74; pls. 78–100.

External links

cruentata
Moths of Mauritius
Endemic fauna of Mauritius
Moths described in 1881